The Association of Women Surgeons (AWS) is a non-profit educational and professional organization founded in 1981. With over 2,000 members in 21 countries, both women and men, AWS is one of the largest international organizations dedicated to supporting, enhancing the interaction, and facilitating the exchange of information between women surgeons at various stages in their careers. The organization's mission statement reads: "To inspire, encourage, and enable women surgeons to achieve their personal and professional goals".

History

The AWS was founded in 1981 when Dr. Patricia Numann posted a sign inviting any woman surgeon to a breakfast at the October meeting of the American College of Surgeons (ACS) in the San Francisco Hilton Hotel. The AWS was incorporated in 1986.

Chapters
The association counts with five local chapters:
Arizona
Massachusetts
North Carolina (Charlotte)
Virginia
Washington DC Metro

In addition, there are over 50 AWS Medical Student Chapters nationally and internationally. Many institutions also have institutional chapters for their female surgical residents.

Key collaborations and partnerships

Association for Academic Surgery – A liaison position exists between the Council of both organizations; this member plans the biennial Women Surgeons luncheon during the Academic Surgical Congress.
American College of Surgeons – In addition to having a Governor from the AWS to the ACS Board of Governors, the AWS has a liaison to the ACS Advisory Council on General Surgery, the ACS Women in Surgery Committee, and the ACS Resident and Associate Society Council. The reception prior to the annual AWS Awards Dinner is co-sponsored by the ACS Women in Surgery Committee.
WiSA (Women in Surgery Africa) – AWS leaders, particularly Drs. Patricia Numann and Hilary Sanfey, provided guidance for the launch of WiSA in 2015 and have provided mentorship for leaders of WiSA.
International Surgical Society – During the biennial World Congress of Surgery, the AWS works with international women surgeons to develop educational panels and social events.
Society of Black Academic Surgeons (SBAS) - A liaison position exists between the council of both organizations; this member organizes a sponsored visiting professorship for an SBAS member who also belongs to the Association of Women Surgeons.
Society of Asian Academic Surgeons (SAAS) - A liaison position exists between the council of both organizations; this member organizes a sponsored visiting professorship for an SAAS member who also belongs to the Association of Women Surgeons.
Latino Surgical Society (LSS) - A liaison position exists between the council of both organizations; this member organizes a sponsored visiting professorship for an LSS member who also belongs to the Association of Women Surgeons.

Past presidents

 1981 – 1988 – Patricia Numann
 1988 – 1990 – Tamar Earnest
 1990 – 1992 – Mary McCarthy
 1992 – 1994 – Linda Phillips
 1994 – 1995 – Margaret Dunn
 1995 – 1996 – Joyce Majure
 1996 – 1997 – M. Margaret Kemeny
 1997 – 1998 – Leigh Neumayer
 1998 – 1999 – Beth Sutton
 1999 – 2000 – Dixie Mills
 2000 – 2001 – Kim Ephgrave
 2001 – 2002 – Myriam Curet
 2002 – 2003 – Susan Kaiser
 2003 – 2004 – Vivian Gahtan
 2004 – 2005 – Susan Stuart
 2005 – 2006 – Hilary Sanfey
 2006 – 2007 – Patricia Bergen
 2007 – 2008 – Mary Hooks
 2008 – 2009 – AJ Copeland
 2009 – 2010 – Rosemary Kozar
 2010 – 2011 – Marilyn Marx
 2011 – 2012 – Betsy Tuttle-Newhall
 2012 – 2013 – Susan Pories
 2013 – 2014 – Danielle Walsh
 2014 – 2015 – Nancy Gantt
 2015 – 2016 – Amalia Cochran
 2016 – 2017 – Christine Laronga
 2017 – 2018 – Celeste Hollands
 2018 – 2019 – Sareh Parengi
 2019 - 2020 - Sharon Stein
 2020 - 2021 - Marie Crandall
 2021 - 2022 - Elizabeth Shaughnessy

Sponsored awards and past winners

AWS/Ethicon Fellowship – $27,500 unrestricted research grant awarded annually to an AWS member.
Kim Ephgrave Visiting Professor Award – provides academic institutions the opportunity to host leading women surgeons as speakers using funding from the AWS Foundation.
Nina Starr Braunwald Award (1993—present) recognizes a member or nonmember surgeon in recognition of sustained outstanding contributions to the advancement of women in surgery.
Olga Jonasson Distinguished Member Award (1990–present) is given annually to an AWS member who through outstanding mentorship enables and encourages women surgeons to realize their personal and professional goals.
Past Presidents' Honorary Member Award (1990–present) is awarded annually to non-members who are supportive of AWS goals and mission. Of note, 16 of the recipients of this award have been male surgeons.
Hilary Sanfey Outstanding Woman Resident Award (1999–present) recognizes outstanding women surgical trainees who demonstrate potential as future leaders in surgery.
Patricia Numann Medical Student Award (2003–present) was established to encourage and support female medical students pursuing a career in surgery.
Women Surgeons in Low & Middle Income Countries (2016–present) was established to enable a woman surgeon in a low or middle income country to attend a surgical meeting or to participate in a workshop or other career development/ educational opportunity.
The Dr. Sally Abston AWS Distinguished Member Award is awarded to AWS member who is nationally recognized for clinical expertise and for providing outstanding mentorship.

References

External links
 

Organizations established in 1981
Organizations for women in science and technology
Surgical organizations based in the United States
Medical and health professional associations in Chicago